The 1973 Major League Baseball All-Star Game was the 44th midseason exhibition between the all-stars of the American League (AL) and the National League (NL), the two leagues comprising Major League Baseball. The game was played on July 24, 1973, at Royals Stadium in Kansas City, Missouri, home of the Kansas City Royals of the American League.  The game resulted in a 7–1 victory for the NL.

Royals Stadium had not even been open for four months when it hosted this, its first All-Star Game.  The game had been hosted in Kansas City once before (1960) when the Kansas City Athletics had been the host team at Kansas City's Municipal Stadium.  After this game was played, the Royals did not host another All-Star Game until they were awarded the 2012 All-Star Game.

Arrowhead Stadium, which shares the same parking lot as part of the Harry S. Truman Sports Complex, hosted the 1974 Pro Bowl about six months after this game.

This game marked the 40th anniversary year of the first All-Star Game in 1933.  As a part of that recognition, some of the surviving stars from that first game, including Dick Bartell, Joe Cronin, Jimmie Dykes, Charlie Gehringer, Lefty Gomez, Lefty Grove, Bill Hallahan, and Carl Hubbell were in attendance.

National League roster 

The National League roster included 11 future Hall of Fame players and coaches, denoted in italics.

Elected starters

Pitchers

Reserve position players

Coaching staff

American League roster 
The American League roster included 11 future Hall of Fame players and coaches, denoted in italics.

Elected starters

Pitchers

Reserve position players

Coaching staff

Starting lineups 
While the starters were elected by the fans, the batting orders and starting pitchers were selected by the managers.

Umpires

Scoring summary 
Scoring began in the bottom of the second inning, with Rick Wise in his second and final inning of pitching for the NL.  Reggie Jackson led off with a double, and came home when the next batter, Amos Otis, singled.  This would be the beginning and end of scoring for the American League.

The National League wasted no time coming back, taking advantage of new pitcher, Bert Blyleven, in the top of the third inning.  Darrell Evans, pinch hitting for Rick Wise, walked, and was forced out at second base when Pete Rose hit into a fielder's choice.  Joe Morgan walked.  César Cedeño's single scored Rose, and sent Morgan to third base.  Hank Aaron singled to Murcer who threw out Cedeño at third, but not before Morgan had scored to give the NL a 2–1 lead.

The NL added a single run in the top of the fourth inning, as Johnny Bench, the first hitter AL relief pitcher Bill Singer faced, hit a lead off home run.

In the top of the fifth inning, the NL scoring continued off of Bill Singer.  Joe Morgan led off with a double.  Three hitters later, with two outs, Bobby Bonds hit a two-run home run, bringing the score to 5–1.

In the top of the sixth inning, Nolan Ryan came in to pitch in relief, though the outcome was virtually identical to the previous inning.  Ron Santo led off with a walk.  Two batters later with one out, Willie Davis, pinch hitting for the pitcher, Don Sutton, hit a two-run home run to extend the NL lead to 7–1, and closing out scoring for the game.

Line score

Game notes and records 
Rick Wise was credited with the win.  Bert Blyleven was credited with the loss.  Jim Brewer was credited with the save.

This was the 24th and final All-Star Game appearance for Willie Mays. Mays appeared in every game from 1954 to 1973. Only Hank Aaron and Stan Musial have played in as many All-Star Games as Mays.

Jim Spencer became the first member of the Texas Rangers to appear in an All-Star Game. The Rangers were playing their second season in Arlington, Texas after moving from Washington, D.C., where they were the second incarnation of the Washington Senators from 1961 to 1971. Toby Harrah, Texas' lone representative in the 1972 game, was injured. 

Catfish Hunter was removed from the game in the second inning after Billy Williams hit a line drive that hit Hunter's right hand, breaking his thumb.  He missed two weeks of the regular season.

This All-Star Game saw 54 players (28 for the NL and 26 for the AL) enter the game.  This became a new All-Star Game record for participating players.

Buddy Bell became the second son of a former All-Star (Gus Bell) to appear in an All-Star Game.

In total, there were 19 future hall of famers involved with the game.  The non-players involved in the 1973 All-Star Game that have been inducted into the Baseball Hall of Fame are Sparky Anderson, Dick Williams, Whitey Herzog, and Nestor Chylak.

As of 2020, Royals Stadium is the last facility to host the MLB All-Star Game in its first season of operation. Cincinnati's Riverfront Stadium hosted the 1970 game 12 days after it opened, and St. Louis' Busch Memorial Stadium opened two months prior to the 1966 game. Pittsburgh's Three Rivers Stadium, which opened two weeks after Riverfront, hosted the 1974 game. Royals Stadium was scheduled to open for the 1972 season, but labor strife and bad weather caused long delays, forcing the Royals to spend 1972 at Municipal Stadium.

Notes

References

External links 
1973 All-Star Game Summary @ baseball-almanac.com
1973 All-Star Game Summary @ Baseball-Reference.com
1973 All-Star Game box score
1973 All-Star Game play-by-play

All-Star Game
1973
20th century in Kansas City, Missouri
Major League Baseball All Star Game
July 1973 sports events in the United States
Baseball competitions in Kansas City, Missouri